Tōru Matsumoto (Matsumoto Tōru) is a retired Japanese badminton player from NTT East Badminton Club. He studied in Hieizan High School graduated from and Waseda University. After playing 8 years in club, he served as a manager for 3 years before finally retiring in 2015.

Achievements

IBF International 
Men's singles

Men's doubles

Mixed doubles

References 

1977 births
Living people
Sportspeople from Mie Prefecture
Japanese male badminton players
21st-century Japanese people